Bernard Guy Georges Cazeneuve (born 2 June 1963) is a French politician and lawyer who served as Prime Minister of France from 6 December 2016 to 15 May 2017. A member of the Socialist Party, he represented Manche’s 5th constituency in the National Assembly from 1997 to 2002 and again from 2007 to 2012. On 4 May 2022, following the Socialist Party's electoral coalition agreement with the leftist La France Insoumise, he left the Socialist Party because he felt La France Insoumise did not match the values and morals of the Socialist Party.

He was Mayor of Cherbourg-Octeville from 2001 to 2012. In 2012, he was appointed Minister delegate for European Affairs in the Ayrault government. A year later, Cazeneuve was named Minister delegate for the Budget after the resignation of Jérôme Cahuzac. In 2014, he was appointed Minister of the Interior in the First Valls government, a role he retained with the formation of the Second Valls government. In 2016, Cazeneuve was appointed Prime Minister by President François Hollande, after Manuel Valls resigned to concentrate on his candidacy for the 2017 presidential election. Following the election of Emmanuel Macron as President of the French Republic, Cazeneuve resigned from office and returned to private practice.

Education and private career
Bernard Cazeneuve was born on 2 June 1963 in Senlis, Oise. His father was the head of the Socialist Party in Oise, which gave him the opportunity to attend a meeting with François Mitterrand. During his studies at the Institut d'études politiques de Bordeaux, he led the Young Radicals of the Left movement in the Gironde department. After graduating from the IEP de Bordeaux, he joined the Socialist Party.

Cazeneuve began his career as a legal adviser in Groupe Banque Populaire, before starting in politics. In 1991, he became a councillor in the cabinet of Thierry de Beaucé, Secretary of State for International Cultural Relations, then in 1992, Principal Private Secretary for Secretary of State for Foreign Affairs Alain Vivien. In 1993, he was appointed Principal Private Secretary in the cabinet of Charles Josselin, Secretary of State for the Sea. That same year, he was named Secretary General of the Council on Boating and Nautical Sports.

Early political career

Member of the National Assembly for Manche

First term (1997–2002)
Rising in the Socialist Party, Cazeneuve moved in 1994 to Octeville in Manche department to put an end to local divisions in party politics, which had led to a loss of the mayor's office in 1989. That same year, he was elected General Councillor. He held the position in the Manche department from 1994 to 1998. He was later elected mayor of Octeville where he served from 1995 to 2000. In 1997, he was elected to the National Assembly representing the 5th constituency of Manche, campaigning on the issue of a "Greater Cherbourg", which would combine the six communes of the Cherbourg urban agglomeration. This issue went to referendum; it led to the combination of two communes, Cherbourg and Octeville.

Second term (2007–2012)
In 2007, Cazeneuve represented the Socialist Party in the legislative election for the 5th Constituency of Manche, defeating UMP candidate Jean Lemière with 58.96% of the vote. After this victory he resigned from his position with the Regional Council of Lower Normandy. Then, facing divided opposition from the right in the 2008 municipal elections, he retained his position as mayor of Cherbourg-Octeville. In his second term as mayor, he campaigned to promote the maritime character of the city, organising a nautical festival that featured an international sailing competition. He also focused on urban renewal of the Bassins and Provinces quarters of Cherbourg-Octeville, bringing together commercial and cultural projects.

On the national level, he represented the victims of the 2002 Karachi bus bombing, who were mostly from Cotentin, against their employer DCNS. As Secretary of the Commission on National Defense in the National Assembly, he was recorder between November 2009 and May 2010 of the Parliamentary inquiry into the Karachi attack. Due to the lack of government transparency regarding the Karachi case, Cazeneuve wrote a book titled Karachi, the impossible investigation.

After supporting no candidate in the 2011 Socialist Party presidential primary, he was named as one of candidate François Hollande's four spokespersons. He spoke to the media on issues related to industry and nuclear power, particularly the latter due to his role in not postponing the construction of a new reactor at the Flamanville Nuclear Power Plant and the reprocessing of nuclear waste at the La Hague site.

Mayor of Cherbourg-Octeville
Cazeneuve was elected to head the new commune of Cherbourg-Octeville in 2001, succeeding Jean-Pierre Godefroy and defeating the Rally for the Republic (RPR) candidate Jean Lemière. His political ascent was interrupted by a defeat for reelection to his seat in the National Assembly in the 2002 elections.

At the same time, he pursued a judicial career, being named a judge to the High Court and Cour de Justice de la République during his term as a member of the National Assembly. He was called to the bar of Cherbourg-Octeville in 2003.

In 2004, François Hollande convinced Cazeneuve to join the Socialist Party electoral list for the 2004 regional elections, representing the Manche department in the Regional Council of Lower Normandy, after Jean-Pierre Godefroy withdrew from consideration. His strong favour for nuclear energy, particularly the construction of a new nuclear reactor on the Cotentin, caused a rift between the Socialist Party and The Greens, who allied with the Radical Party of the Left in the first round of the regional election. After the victory of the Socialist Party, led by Philippe Duron, Cazeneuve was appointed first Vice-President of the Regional Council and President of the Regional Norman Tourism Committee, comprising the regions of Upper and Lower Normandy.

In 2005 he supported the "no" vote on the Treaty establishing a Constitution for Europe. Between 2006 and 2008 Cazeneuve worked for a Paris law firm, August & Debouzy, in their "Public, Regulation, and Competition" practice.

Presidency of François Hollande

Minister delegate for European Affairs

Mentioned as a potential minister, notably for the Defense portfolio, he was named on 16 May 2012 as Minister delegate for European Affairs, serving under Laurent Fabius in the Ministry of Foreign Affairs.

In the 2012 legislative elections he was re-elected to the National Assembly in the newly redrawn 4th Constituency of Manche, with Geneviève Gosselin, the deputy mayor of Cherbourg-Octeville, as his alternate. He won the election in June with 55.39% of the vote, but had to resign to assume his post in the new government, leading to Gosselin becoming the new deputy to the National Assembly. He also resigned as mayor of Cherbourg-Octeville, with the position being taken by Jean-Michel Houllegatte. As minister, he was tasked with defending the 2012 European Fiscal Compact to Socialist deputies in the National Assembly.

Minister delegate for the Budget
On 19 March 2013, he was named Minister delegate for the Budget after the resignation of Jérôme Cahuzac, who was accused of fraud. He was replaced as Junior Minister for European Affairs by Thierry Repentin, formerly Minister of State for Professional Training and Apprenticeship. He affirmed a policy of reducing the deficit to save 5 billion euros from the national budget for 2014. He intervened personally in the National Assembly to bury an amendment enlarging the tax base for a proposed tax on transactions for high frequency trading, one of François Hollande's campaign promises. He also proposed an amendment to increase the value added tax on equestrian activities from 7% to 20%, called the "equitax", which encountered strong opposition from professionals and amateurs in the equestrian world.

Minister of the Interior

On 2 April 2014, Cazeneuve was named Minister of the Interior in the First Valls Government. In January 2015, he directed the response to the Île-de-France attacks.

During a vote on a counter-terrorism law, he proposed an amendment that would give authority to demand that search engines de-list certain website without the approval of a judge. In July 2015, he proposed a reform to the rights of foreigners in France, which would fundamentally change policies concerning entry and length of stay.

As a spokesman for France after 18 November 2015 killing of the suspected mastermind of the terrorists responsible for the November 2015 Paris attacks, Cazeneuve told the press that Abdelhamid Abaaoud, a Moroccan who was a Belgian national who had visited Syria, "played a decisive role" in the Paris attacks and played a part in four of six terror attacks foiled since spring, with one alleged jihadist claiming Abaaoud had trained him personally.

Cazeneuve said that he would be meeting with EU ministers on 20 November in Brussels to discuss how to deal with terrorism across the territory because "cooperation in the fight against terrorism is crucial" in the European Union. "We have to move quickly and strongly. Europe must do it while thinking about the victims of terrorism and their loved ones."

Reports after that meeting indicated that all EU citizens entering or leaving the free-travel area, known as Schengen, should undergo "systematic" screening against pan-European databases. "Terrorists are crossing the borders of the European Union", said Cazeneuve. Indeed, all of the known Paris attackers were EU nationals, who crossed borders without difficulty although they were registered as terrorism suspects, according to The Guardian. Cazeneuve, said the clampdown on borders would take effect immediately. This would be on a temporary basis until the European commission modified the Schengen rules to make the new borders regime mandatory and obligatory; that could take months to enact.

Prime Minister of France
Valls announced on 6 December 2016 that, as the likely candidate for the Socialist Party in the presidential election, he would resign to concentrate on campaigning. Cazeneuve was appointed by outgoing President Hollande to replace Valls. The appointment was considered difficult, since it resulted in a change of leadership in the Interior Ministry at a time when the French terror alert was at its highest level. Cazeneuve officially resigned on 10 May, after the official announcement of the results of the presidential election. His tenure as Prime Minister, at five months and four days, is the shortest in the history of the Fifth Republic. He was replaced by Édouard Philippe, nominated by new President Emmanuel Macron.

Other activities
 Fight Impunity, Member of the Honorary Board (–2022)

Personal life
Cazeneuve has a wife, Véronique, and two children. The couple divorced but remarried on 12 August 2015 in Aiguines. She is an editor at Éditions À dos d'âne, a publisher of young adult fiction. They reside in Domaine du Lys-Chantilly, a tree-lined community in Oise not far from Paris.

He was a business lawyer from 2006 to 2008.

Works

References

|-

|-

|-

1963 births
Living people
Departmental councillors (France)
Deputies of the 11th National Assembly of the French Fifth Republic
Deputies of the 13th National Assembly of the French Fifth Republic
Deputies of the 14th National Assembly of the French Fifth Republic
French interior ministers
Government ministers of France
Mayors of places in Normandy
People from Senlis
Politicians from Hauts-de-France
Prime Ministers of France
Socialist Party (France) politicians
Grand Crosses with Star and Sash of the Order of Merit of the Federal Republic of Germany
Commandeurs of the Légion d'honneur
Grand Officers of the Order of Merit of the Italian Republic
Members of Parliament for Manche